Pytho seidlitzi is a species of dead log beetle in the family Pythidae. It is found in North America.

References

Further reading

 
 
 
 
 

Tenebrionoidea
Beetles described in 1925